Wójcicki is a Polish masculine surname, its feminine counterpart is Wójcicka. The surname may refer to the following notable people:
 Anne Wojcicki (born 1973), American biologist
 Esther Wojcicki (born 1941), American journalist
Franciszek Wójcicki (1900–1983), Polish politician
 Jakub Wójcicki (born 1988), Polish football defender 
 Janina Wójcicka Hoskins (1912–1996), Polish-American librarian
 Katarzyna Bachleda-Curuś née Wójcicka (born 1980), Polish speed skater
 Patrick Wojcicki (born 1991), German boxer
 Roman Wójcicki (born 1958), Polish footballer
 Sara Wojcicki Jimenez (born 1979), American politician 
 Stanley Wojcicki (born 1937), Polish American physicist
 Susan Wojcicki (born 1968), American businesswoman

See also 
 Wójcik, similar surname

Polish-language surnames
Surnames of Polish origin